Haplosplanchnidae is a family of flatworms belonging to the order Plagiorchiida.

Genera

Genera:
 Discocephalotrema Machida, 1993
 Haplosplanchnoides Nahhas & Cable, 1964
 Haplosplanchnus Looss, 1902

References

Platyhelminthes